Mirza Aftabul Qader was a Bangladesh Army officer who was killed in the Bangladesh Liberation war. He was posthumously awarded Bir Uttam by the government of Bangladesh.

Early life
Qader was born in Lakshmipur, East Bengal, Pakistan on 25 December 1948. He completed his SSC Ananda Mohan College in Mymensingh and HSC from Anandamohan College. He entered Dhaka University English Department.

Career
While Qader was still a freshman in Dhaka University he joined the 39 Long Course of Pakistan Military Academy on 16 November 1966. On 25 November 1968, he received his commission in the Pakistan Army and was stationed in the 40 Field Artillery Regiment.  He arrived in Dhaka in February 1971 for holiday. He witnessed the start of Operation Searchlight and the violence used by the Pakistan Army on 25 March 1971. He left home on 27 March 1971 to join the Bangladesh Liberation war. He initially joined up with Bengali members of East Pakistan Rifles (present Border Guards Bangladesh), who were located near Shuvapur bridge in Chittagong. He fought several battles there and in Rangamati district.

Death
Qader's unit was attacked by a combine force of Pakistan Army commandoes and Mizo Lion Brigade of the Mizo insurgency on 27 April 1971. He fought the ambush using his LMG; he was killed in action. His body was buried in Ramgarh Upazila near the battlefield. He was awarded Bir Uttom, second highest award for individual gallantry in Bangladesh. Shaheed Captain Aftabul Qader, Bir Uttam Memorial Trust Fund was set up in 2012 in his memory.

Footnotes

References

1948 births
1971 deaths
Bangladesh Army officers
Recipients of the Bir Uttom
People from Lakshmipur District
University of Dhaka alumni
Mukti Bahini personnel